John III may refer to:

People
 John III (bishop of Jerusalem) in 516–524
 Pope John III, Pope from 561 to his death in 574
 John Scholasticus, Patriarch of Constantinople from 565 to his death in 577
 John III Rizocopo, Exarch of Ravenna from 710 to 711
 John III of the Sedre, Syriac Orthodox Patriarch of Antioch from 631 to his death in 648
 John III of Naples, Duke from 928 to his death in 968
 John III of Gaeta, Duke from 984 to his death in 1008
 John III of Amalfi, Duke in 1073
 John III Doukas Vatatzes (c. 1192 – 1254), Emperor of Nicaea
 John III Comyn of Badenoch (died 1306)
 John III, Duke of Brittany (1286–1341)
 John III, Duke of Brabant (1300–1355)
 John III Megas Komnenos (c. 1321 – 1362), Emperor of Trebizond
 John III of Montferrat (c. 1362 – 1381)
 John III, Burgrave of Nuremberg (c. 1369 – 1420)
 John III, Count of Auvergne (1467–1501)
 Ivan III of Russia (1440–1505), Grand Duke of Russia since 1462
 John III of Navarre (1469–1516)
 John III Crispo, Duke of the Archipelago (1480–1494)
 John III, Duke of Cleves (1490–1539)
 John III of Portugal (1502–1557), King of Portugal and of the Algarves
 John III of Sweden (1537–1592)
 John III Sobieski (1629–1696), King of Poland and Grand Duke of Lithuania
 Yohannes III of Ethiopia (c. 1824 – c. 1873), Emperor several times between 1840 and 1851
 Prince Jean, Duke of Guise, pretended to the title John III, King of the French, 1926–1940

Biblical
John 3, the third chapter of the Gospel of John
Third Epistle of John or 3 John
Ioannes III (disambiguation)

John 03